NBC 14 may refer to one of the following television stations in the United States:

Current affiliates
KLAF-LD in Lafayette, Louisiana
WFIE in Evansville, Indiana

Formerly affiliated
KLAA (now KARD) in West Monroe, Louisiana (1974 to 1981)
KLNO/KXAM-TV (now KBVO) in Llano, Texas (1991 to 2009)
Was a semi-satellite of KXAN-TV in Austin